John Geoffrey Tracey  (1930 – 30 July 2004) was an Australian ecologist and botanist whose pioneering research work in partnership with Dr. Leonard Webb  within the Rainforest Ecology Unit of the CSIRO in the 1950s led to the publication of the first systematic classification of Australian rainforest vegetation in the Journal of Ecology in 1959. By the early 80's, after decades of ongoing research, Tracey and Webb had accumulated a significant corpus of scientific evidence in support of the theory that Australian tropical rainforests had evolved in Gondwana over 100 million years ago and were not, as previously believed, relatively recent arrivals from South East Asia. This evidence, in combination with Tracey and Webb's 1975 publication of a collection of 15 vegetation maps entitled "Vegetation of the Humid Tropical Region of North Queensland", and Tracey's 1982 paper "The Vegetation of the Humid Tropical Region of North Queensland", helped to establish the scientific basis for a number of major conservation campaigns across Queensland and paved the way for the subsequent successful World Heritage nomination of the Wet Tropics of Queensland by Aila Keto in 1988.

Early life 

Geoff Tracey was born in Cairns in 1930. He was raised, along with his younger brother, by his mother after his father died from Tuberculosis when he was two years old. Tracey was initially educated at Saint Monica's and St Augustine's College in Cairns and spent much of his spare time in his early years fishing and exploring the mudflats, rainforest streams and swamps around the city's fringe.

During World War II Tracey and his family relocated to Laura Station (later to become a part of Rinyirru National Park), near the township of Laura on Cape York where they spent 6 months living with relatives in 1942. His mother had been concerned about the possible threat of a Japanese invasion of Cairns and felt the remote location would offer relative safety for her family. Tracey spent much of his time around the Laura Station exploring the biologically rich natural landscape of the area as well as fishing with an  indigenous stockman who was known only to Tracey by his English name ‘Bob Ross’. They had developed a close friendship during Tracey's time on the station with Ross educating him about the landscape and many of the traditional uses of local plants. Tracey was to later cite his time at Laura Station as a formative influence upon his subsequent ecological work.

Tracey's family moved to Brisbane in the mid-40's where he boarded at a Marist Brother's college before enrolling to study agriculture at Gatton Agricultural College from 1947 to 1948 (Tracey later furthered his studies in Botany at the University of Queensland in the early 1960s).

After his graduation from Gatton, Tracey spent a six-week period working for the Queensland Lands Department. He resigned from the position not long after starting on account of his dissatisfaction with the nature of the work which involved monitoring the fulfilment of soldier settlement land clearing conditions after the Second World War.

In December 1949, he took up a position at the CSIRO alongside Dr Leonard Webb as a technical assistant for the research work which Webb was conducting in the search for new plant based drugs as a part of the Australian Phytochemical Survey. A major part of Tracey's work during this period involved collecting samples of plants for testing on request from Webb and other scientists both within Australia and abroad. This work required that he take annual field trips back to the rainforests of North Queensland which were frequently found to contain the broadest range of plants required for sample gathering.

CSIRO Rainforest Ecology Research Unit 

In the mid 50's, as CSIRO's interest in phytochemical research waned, Webb, with the direct support of CSIRO head Sir Otto Frankel, made the decision to move into the newly emerging scientific field of Ecology. Based upon the work which they were already conducting within Australian rainforests, funds were apportioned for Webb and Tracey to establish a CSIRO Rainforest Ecology research unit. Their work in the field was to complement the new research being carried out by Alec Costin (Snowy Mountains and Alpine flora) and Milton Moore (the woodlands of Australia) within the ecology section of the CSIRO Division of Plant Industry.

Desmond Herbert, who at the time was Botany Professor at the University of Queensland initially provided a home for the Rainforest Ecology unit within the university's Botany department. A few years later Harry Wharton, a researcher interested in malaria and tropical diseases, offered Webb & Tracey some modern rooms in a new building being built for the division of animal culture laboratory at Long Pocket in Brisbane. Wharton was enthusiastic about the work Tracey and Webb had been doing and required their help in establishing a rainforest on the grounds of Long Pocket to aid his research. The Long Pocket location represented a substantial increase in laboratory space for Webb and Tracey and was to become the home of the CSIRO Rainforest Ecology unit up until its closure in the early 1980s.

The research work conducted by Webb, Tracey and other collaborators within the CSIRO Rainforest Ecology Unit led to the publication of a long series of pioneering research papers in the field, from the first systematic classification of Australian rainforest vegetation in the Journal of Ecology in 1959 to the first major framework for floristic classification of Australian rainforests in 1984 after Webb had retired from CSIRO.

The vegetation of the humid tropical region of North Queensland 

In 1980, near the end of his tenure at the CSIRO Long Pocket Laboratories, Tracey  completed work on the first major ecological survey of the Wet Tropics of Queensland which was later published by CSIRO in 1982. The 124 page book entitled ‘The vegetation of the humid tropical region of North Queensland’ was to become the primary reference for the ecological description of different rainforest vegetation communities within the region.

The book followed on from Webb and Tracey's initial effort at overall classification of the Wet Tropics rainforest vegetation types in the set of  15 1:100,000 vegetation maps which they produced for publication by CSIRO in 1975. The maps had been produced to provide an ecological background for recent studies of the region by the authors and their collaborators, such as Jiro Kikkawa, W. T. Williams and M. B. Dale and were accompanied by a detailed explanatory key to the different vegetation types.

Tracey's publication adapted the same typological system used for the preceding mapping project whilst providing more detailed descriptions of the different vegetation types and their various ecological relationships. The main rainforest types in North Queensland were classified in relation to rainfall, altitude, soil parent materials and drainage status (as determined by topography and rainfall). The classifications were accompanied by descriptions of the different habitats, their present-day extent and the floristics of a typical reference area (along with details of their variability and disturbance histories).

The study identified 24 broad types of vegetation within the region including 12 major types of rainforest vegetation which Tracey then broke down into 17 distinct sub-types based upon a variety of geological, climactic, floristic and topographic variables. The first book of its kind in Australia, ‘The vegetation of the humid tropical region of North Queensland’ received three separate print runs by CSIRO over the following decade and was to provide the primary scientific basis in support of the subsequent nomination and listing of the Wet Tropics of Queensland World Heritage area in 1988.

Trees for the Evelyn and Atherton Tablelands 
In 1982, Tracey and botanist Joan Wright in collaboration with Peter Stanton, Regional Director of the Queensland Parks and Wildlife Service, established Trees for the Evelyn and Atherton Tablelands (TREAT), a community-based rainforest nursery and tree planting organisation based at Lake Eacham National Park with the aim of revegetating degraded lands in order to create corridors for wildlife in Far North Queensland. For this work Tracey was awarded the Member of the Order of Australia in the 1996 Australian Honours ceremony "For service to conservation and the environment, particularly tropical forest maintenance and planting in North Queensland, through the organisation Trees for the Evelyn and Atherton Tablelands (TREAT)"

Selected works

References

1930 births
2004 deaths
20th-century Australian botanists
Australian ecologists
Members of the Order of Australia